Thug Stories is the sixth studio album by Bone Thugs-N-Harmony, released September 19, 2006 on Koch Records. It marked the first time Bone recorded as a trio for a full album, as Bizzy Bone  was still ejected from the group. Upon release, the album sold 40,000 units in its first week, eventually peaking at number 25 on the Billboard 200 and number one on the Independent Album Charts. Thug Stories was the group's first major label LP length release since 2002's Thug World Order Ruthless Records. As of April 11, 2007, it has sold 92,465 copies.

Songs and music
Featuring a slightly matured style with this LP, the group leaned more heavily towards its harmonic roots than its "thug" origins. The tracks "She Got Crazy", "So Sad", and "Call Me" center on the members' past and present issues with women; while "Don't Stop", "Do It Again", and "Thug Stories" serve as ex-post-facto anthems. "Fire" boasts of Bone's superior flowing skills while simultaneously showcasing them. Krayzie and Layzie bite into the microphone with their signature rapid-fire delivery on the track "What You See (Reload)" as the album transitions towards a glimpse of The Thugs' evolution. "Stand Not In Our Way" flouts the temptations of "Beelzebub" and touts faith in "Yahweh" in hypnotic fashion. Reggae overtones fuel the sequel "Still No Surrender", while a great disdain for law enforcement ignites the track. The ominous narrative "This Life" rounds out the album with tales of hopelessness and a flavor unique to Bone.

Track listing

Personnel

Musicians
Bone Thugs-n-Harmony – vocals
Chris Ackerman – keyboards
DJ Mike T – scratching, sound effects, producer, engineer
Gary "Sugar Foot" Greenberg – percussion, drums, producer
Steve Pageot – flute, keyboards, producer, engineer, drum programming

Production
Steve Begala – engineer
Steve Estiverne – producer
David Frederic – engineer, mixing
Kush Kato – producer
Steve Lobel – executive producer
Guy Long – producer
Mally Mall – producer
Kenny McCloud – producer
Big Rush – producer
Bone Thugs-n-Harmony – executive producer
Janice Combs – producer
Ree Dogg – producer

Appearances
 Krayzie Bone appears on all tracks
 Layzie Bone appears on all tracks
 Wish Bone appears on 11 tracks

Chart positions

Album

References

Bone Thugs-n-Harmony albums
2006 albums
E1 Music albums